Tahta ( / , ALA-LC: Ṭahṭā; ;) is a city in the Sohag Governorate of Upper Egypt. It is located on the west bank of the Nile in an area known for its agricultural richness. Tahta had a population of 85,528 in the 2017 census. Egyptologists believe that the modern name may derive from the word Ta-ho-ty. Two famous monasteries are located near Tahta, the White Monastery and the Red Monastery.  The town has a small but significant Coptic Catholic community.  Its most famous resident was the reformist intellectual Rifa'a al-Tahtawi, who was born in Tahta in 1801, and who wrote and translated many books following his trip to Paris in 1826 as the imam and chaplain for the first group of Egyptians whom Mehmet Ali Pasha (Muhammad Ali Pasha) sent to study in western Europe.

Villages
Villages within the jurisdiction of Tahta include:

 Bani Harb
 Nazlit El Qady
 Banga
 El Sawalim
 Shattoura
 El Soffeha
 El Kom El Asfar
 Zein Eld Din
 Nazlit Ali
 Elsawamaa Gharb
 Banhao
 Bani Ammar
 Eneebis

Notable residents
Rifa'a el-Tahtawi
Naguib Sawiris

See also

 List of cities and towns in Egypt

References

Populated places in Sohag Governorate
Populated places on the Nile
Cities in Egypt